Wanton is a surname. Notable people with the surname include:

George H. Wanton (1868–1940), Buffalo Soldier in the United States Army
Gideon Wanton (1693–1767), Governor of Rhode Island
John Wanton (1672–1740), Governor of Rhode Island
Joseph Wanton (1705–1780), Governor of Rhode Island
Joseph Wanton Jr. (1730–1780), Loyalist in the American Revolution, Deputy Governor of Rhode Island
William Wanton (1670–1733), Governor of Rhode Island

See also

Wonton